Rum & Coke is a 2009 album by British electronica band Dub Pistols. It features guest appearances from Rodney P, Ashley Slater (Freakpower), Lindy Layton (Beats International) and DJ Justin Robertson.

Composition
Rum & Coke incorporates many genres, including reggae, rap, ska, dub and urban music.

Reception
Lou Thomas of BBC Music wrote that the Dub Pistols "kept the quality control high" on Rum & Coke, calling it "a likeable combination of genres that mesh so well." The Independent Andy Gill rated the album three stars out of five, describing it as "a collection of summary, mostly laid-back grooves designed to keep spirits cool at carnival time." Rory Taylor from Contact Music rated Rum & Coke eight out of ten, writing, "I don't think there's need for any further evidence. the Dub Pistols are smokin'."

Track listing 
 "Back to Daylight" – 4:21
 "I'm in Love" – 4:05
 "Everyday Stranger" – 5:01
 "Revitalise" – 5:20
 "Ganja" – 3:55
 "She Moves" – 3:16
 "Peace of Mind" – 5:00
 "Keep the Fire Burning" – 3:52
 "Six Months" – 4:09
 "Song for Summer" – 6:58

Personnel
Personnel for Rum & Coke adapted from Allmusic

Barry Ashworth – writing
William Borez – writing, keyboards, programming
Cody Burridge – photography
Matt Edwards – management
Tim Hutton – guitar, horn
Jason O'Bryan – writing

Rodney Panton – writing
Justin Robertson – writing
Ashley Slater – writing
Matthew Thomas – writing
Oliver J. Woods – assistant

References

2009 albums
Dub Pistols albums